Silent Heaven is a compilation album by composer C.W. Vrtacek, released on March 12, 1996 through Cuneiform Records. It comprises two of Vrtacek's out-of-print records, Learning to Be Silent and When Heaven Comes to Town.

Release and reception 

Allmusic critic François Couture found Vrtacek's work to be "very aerial" and that "one can't help but think of Steve Hackett's Bay of Kings: simple songs with beautiful melodies." He gave Silent Heaven three out of five stars, noting that "some will perceive it as lacking sustenance, but it is refreshing to hear Vrtacek away from the surf guitar licks."

Track listing

Personnel 
Myles Davis – mixing
Steven Feigenbaum – production
Paula Millet – design
Lucinda Wilde Pinchot – photography
C.W. Vrtacek – synthesizer, acoustic guitar, guitar, piano, xylophone, ukulele, tape, production, engineering, mixing, recording

References 

1996 compilation albums
C.W. Vrtacek albums
Cuneiform Records compilation albums